Black Moon is the eighth studio album, and the first in fourteen years, by progressive rock band Emerson, Lake & Palmer, released on 27 June 1992. The band had broken up in 1979, and recorded Black Moon to kick off their 1990s revival.

Production
The track "Affairs of the Heart" originated in summer 1988 sessions by Lake with Geoff Downes under the project name Ride the Tiger. Another song from the sessions, "Money Talks", became "Paper Blood" with a different chorus and new music. Ride the Tiger was finally released in 2015.

Reception

Black Moon received mixed reviews. Jim Allen of AllMusic wrote in a retrospective review that the performers "stripped down their sound and amped up their attack." In his book The Music's All that Matters: A History of Progressive Rock, Paul Stump compared it favorably to its contemporary Union (by fellow progressive rock giants Yes). He explained that Black Moon "did at least aspire to interest and excite the listener, and it would be a churlish mind that overlooked a vigour in the playing which had formerly been notable by its absence. The material, though, suffered from the Yes malaise: cynicism and over-exposure to the wallet-fattening blandishments of easy-out FM mores, intervals and development procedures had blunted edges and dulled nerve-endings both of players and listeners."

Half of the album's songs were played at the band's 1992-1993 concerts. Greg Lake also used to play "Paper Blood", "Farewell to Arms" and "Footprints in the Snow" at his solo performances in 2005. Notably, "Farewell to Arms" was played at the group's final concert, at the High Voltage Festival in July 2010.

Track listing

2017 Deluxe Edition

Personnel
Keith Emerson - Yamaha GX-1, Steinway Grand Piano, Modular Moog, Minimoog
Greg Lake - vocals, guitars, bass, harmonica (on "Paper Blood") 
Carl Palmer - drums, percussion

Production
Producer: Mark Mancina
Engineers: Steve Kempster, Stephen Marcussen, David Mitchell
Assistant engineers: Anthony Danbury, Gil Morales, Marnie Riley, Brett Swain, Charlie Watts
Mixing: Steve Kempster, David Mitchell
Mastering: Stephen Marcussen
Digital editing: Jay Rifkin
Programming: Tim Heintz, Gary Hodgson, Ian Morrow, John Van Tongeren
Keyboard technician: Willie Alexander
Vocal arrangement: Mark Holding

Charts

Singles
 Black Moon [Single Version] / A Blade Of Grass / Black Moon [Album Version]
 Affairs Of The Heart / Better Days / A Blade Of Grass / Black Moon [Radio Version]
 Affairs Of The Heart / Black Moon [Radio Version] / Fanfare For The Common Man [special edit] / Jerusalem

References

Emerson, Lake & Palmer albums
1992 albums
Albums produced by Mark Mancina